Gil Montandon (born April 28, 1965 in Neuchâtel, Switzerland) is a Swiss former professional ice hockey centre. He played in the National League (NL) for HC Fribourg-Gottéron and SC Bern.

Montandon is currently working as a hockey analyst for the Francophone Swiss television station, RTS. He also works as a hockey expert for MySports, the official broadcaster of the Swiss National League. He is also a regular guest on hockey talk show, Les Puckalistes, on the Francophone Swiss television station, La Télé.

Playing career
Montandon made his professional debut during the 1984-85 National League season, playing for HC Fribourg-Gottéron. He went on to play 5 seasons with the team before joining SC Bern in the summer of 1989. He played 11 seasons with Bern, winning 3 Swiss championships. In the summer of 2000, Montandon returned to his former team, HC Fribourg-Gottéron, to play 9 more seasons in the National League. He eventually retired from professional hockey at age 43. He played a total of 1,069 games in the National League, tallying 416 goals and 444 assists.

Achievements
1991 - NL Champion with SC Bern
1992 - NL Champion with SC Bern
1997 - NL Champion with SC Bern

He is the first player to have played 1000 games in the Swiss National League.

International play
Gil Montandon played a total of 156 games for the Swiss national team.

He participated in the following tournaments:

 3 A-World Championships: 1991, 1992, 1993
 3 B-World Championships: 1989, 1990, 1994
 2 Olympic Games: 1988 in Calgary and 1992 in Albertville

Coaching career
Prior to the 2011-12 MySports League season, Montandon was named head coach of HC Université Neuchâtel. He stayed at the helm of the team for 4 seasons before being named General Manager of Swiss League (SL) team, EHC Visp at the beginning of the 2015/16 SL season. He was then named head coach of the team ad interim, before being replaced by Scott Beattie on December 28, 2015.

Personal life
Montandon is the father of Arnaud and Maxime Montandon who both play for HC Sierre of the Swiss League (SL), as a center and a defenseman respectively.

External links
Montandon on hockeyfans.ch
 

1965 births
Living people
HC Fribourg-Gottéron players
Ice hockey players at the 1988 Winter Olympics
Ice hockey players at the 1992 Winter Olympics
Lausanne HC players
Neuchâtel Young Sprinters HC players
Olympic ice hockey players of Switzerland
People from Neuchâtel
SC Bern players
Swiss ice hockey centres
Sportspeople from the canton of Neuchâtel